The Happy Fits is an American indie pop band consisting of Calvin Langman (electric cellist and lead vocalist), Ross Monteith (guitarist and vocalist), and Luke Davis (drummer and vocalist).

History 
The Happy Fits was formed by Rutgers University students Calvin Langman and Ross Monteith in 2016. Luke Davis joined the band to record their debut EP, Awfully Apeelin''', in the summer of 2016, before they left for their first year of college. One of the songs from the EP, "While You Fade Away", was added to Spotify's Fresh Finds playlist shortly after their first semester started. The trio officially dropped out of college in late 2017 to pursue music careers.

In 2018 the band released their debut album, Concentrate.In February 2020 the band finished recording their second album and set out on a tour that was quickly cancelled due to the COVID-19 pandemic. Subsequently the band focused on their social media presence, with weekly livestreams on YouTube. In August 2020 they released their second album, What Could Be Better. Several singles from the album were debuted ahead of the album's release, including "Moving" and "Hold Me Down". The album was named one of the ten best albums of the year by Fresh Air's Ken Tucker.

The band resumed touring in 2021 and early 2022, performing in venues across the United States, from Los Angeles to New York City. On the 2022 leg of their tour they were joined by Sarah and the Sundays. The Happy Fits also joined The Maine for part of their 2022 tour. In early 2022 the group released two singles: "Changes", and "Dance Alone", in March and May respectively.

In August 2022 the group released their first album with a record label, Under the Shade of Green. The album, which took about six months to create, acted as a way for band members to work through the trauma of the COVID-19 pandemic and the social crises occurring during it.

In October 2022 the band travelled to Europe, where they performed in Glasgow, Manchester, London, and Berlin. The band plans to return to Europe in March and April 2023 for performances in the United Kingdom, Germany, Belgium, and the Netherlands.

 Discography 

 Albums 

 Concentrate (2018)
 What Could Be Better (2020)
 Under the Shade of Green (2022); AWAL

 EPs 

 Awfully Apeelin''' (2016)

Singles 

 "Another Try" (August 2021)
 "Changes" (March 2022)
 "Dance Alone" (May 2022)

Awards 

 Makin Waves Band of the Year (2022)

References 

American indie pop groups
Indie rock musical groups from New Jersey
Musical groups established in 2016